In enzymology, a choline oxidase is an enzyme that catalyzes the chemical reaction

choline + O2  betaine aldehyde + H2O2

Thus, the two substrates of this enzyme are choline and O2, whereas its two products are betaine aldehyde and H2O2.

This enzyme belongs to the family of oxidoreductases, specifically those acting on the CH-OH group of donor with oxygen as acceptor.  The systematic name of this enzyme class is choline:oxygen 1-oxidoreductase. This enzyme participates in glycine, serine, and threonine metabolism.  It employs one cofactor, FAD.

References

 
 
 
 
 
 

EC 1.1.3
Flavoproteins
Enzymes of known structure